The Rolette House is located in Prairie du Chien, Wisconsin.

History
Construction of the house was begun by Jean Joseph Rolette, but he died before it was completed. Later, it was turned into a hotel and a boarding house. It was listed on the National Register of Historic Places in 1972 and on the State Register of Historic Places in 1989. The house is one of two properties connected to Rolette to be listed, along with the Brisbois House.

References

Houses on the National Register of Historic Places in Wisconsin
Hotel buildings on the National Register of Historic Places in Wisconsin
National Register of Historic Places in Crawford County, Wisconsin
Houses in Crawford County, Wisconsin
Colonial architecture in the United States
Federal architecture in Wisconsin